Sant Jeroni (el Bruc) is a mountain of Catalonia, Spain. It has an elevation of 1,236 metres above sea level.

See also
Mountains of Catalonia

References

Mountains of Catalonia
One-thousanders of Spain
Emblematic summits of Catalonia